Hibbertia graniticola is a species of flowering plant in the family Dilleniaceae and is endemic to the south-west of Western Australia. It is a shrub with thick, linear leaves and yellow flowers borne singly on the ends of branchlets, with seventeen to thirty stamens arranged around the two or three carpels.

Description
There are seventeen to thirty stamens arranged around the two or three carpels, each carpel containing ten ovules. Flowering occurs from August to September.

Taxonomy
Hibbertia graniticola was first formally described in 1994 by Judy Wheeler in the journal Nuytsia from specimens she collected near Warralakin in 1988. The specific epithet (graniticola) refers to the usual habit of this species, apparently restricted to granite outcrops.

Distribution and habitat
This hibbertia grows in sandy pockets on granite outcrops near Warralakin in the Avon Wheatbelt biogeographic region of south-western Western Australia.

Conservation status
Hibbertia graniticola is classified as "Priority Three" by the Government of Western Australia Department of Parks and Wildlife meaning that it is poorly known and known from only a few locations but is not under imminent threat.

See also
List of Hibbertia species

References

graniticola
Flora of Western Australia
Plants described in 1994